Charles "Chuck" Arnett (February 15, 1928, in Bogalusa, Louisiana – March 2, 1988, in San Francisco, California) was an American artist and dancer. His best known work is the Tool Box mural (1962).

History 
Arnett grew up in Bogalusa and New Orleans, the latter of which he would later always claim as his hometown. He danced in the local ballet successfully for several seasons before moving in 1951 to New York City to better pursue the career he wanted to make for himself in the world of professional dance. Arriving with letters of introduction and names of people to contact from his time as a dancer in New Orleans, he quickly settled into the life of those in Manhattan who referred to themselves as "theatrical gypsies." His next few years his time was divided between the best dance classes he could get enrolled into, practice, auditioning for parts, and rehearsing and then performing on the stage. He then performed for some time with the National Ballet of Canada; the time he spent with the National Ballet was the only full-time, permanent employment he would ever hold in his life.

After the National Ballet and dancing in Las Vegas casinos, Arnett later moved to San Francisco where he worked at a bar called the Tool Box. South of Market in San Francisco had become the hub of the leather subculture in the gay community in 1961 when the Tool Box opened its doors as the first leather bar in the neighborhood. It opened in 1961 at 339 4th St and closed in 1971. It was a gay bar frequented by gay motorcycle clubs. It was made famous by the June 1964 Paul Welch Life article entitled "Homosexuality In America," the first time a national publication reported on gay issues. Life photographer was referred to the Tool Box by Hal Call, who had long worked to dispel the myth that all homosexual men were effeminate. The article opened with a two-page spread of the mural of life size leathermen in the bar, which had been painted by Arnett in 1962. The article described San Francisco as "The Gay Capital of America" and inspired many gay leathermen to move there.

One busy night Rudolf Nureyev came into the Tool Box with several men obviously from the opera house where he was performing. He was seated at the bar and with many people watching, removed the coat he had on, revealing a leather jacket, to applause. Arnett brought his drink, a cognac, in the best glass the house could provide, and when he finished it and left, Arnett took the glass.

Arnett also created a psychedelic black light mural for the bar The Stud.

Arnett died on March 2, 1988, from AIDS.

The San Francisco South of Market Leather History Alley consists of four works of art along Ringold Alley honoring leather culture; it opened in 2017. One of the works of art is a black granite stone etched with a narrative by Gayle Rubin and a reproduction of Arnett's Tool Box mural. Another of the works of art is bronze bootprints along the curb which honor 28 people (including Arnett) who were an important part of the leather communities of San Francisco.

Further reading 
 "Artist Chuck Arnett: His Life/Our Times," by Jack Fritscher, from Leatherfolk: Radical Sex, People, Politics, and Practice, edited by Mark Thompson (Boston: Alyson Publications, 1991).

References 

1928 births
1988 deaths
AIDS-related deaths in California
American male ballet dancers
Artists from San Francisco
Leather subculture
National Ballet of Canada dancers
People from Bogalusa, Louisiana
20th-century American ballet dancers